The A Trick of the Tail Tour was a concert tour of the United States, Canada and European countries by English rock band Genesis. This was the first tour after Peter Gabriel left the band, and the only one with Bill Bruford on drums.

"A lot of the band thought he could sing better than I did anyway," remarked Gabriel of Phil Collins, who took over lead vocals. "The singing side he could handle, but I don't think he enjoyed singing some of my more obscure lyrics."

The tour began on 26 March 1976 in London, Ontario, Canada and ended on 11 July 1976 in Luton, England. Shows in Glasgow and Stafford were filmed for Genesis: In Concert (1976).

Setlist 
 "Dance on a Volcano"
 The Lamb Lies Down on Broadway Medley (aka "Lamb Stew" / "Lamb Casserole" / "Lamb Cutlet")
 "The Lamb Lies Down on Broadway" 
 "Fly on a Windshield" 
 "Broadway Melody of 1974" 
 "The Carpet Crawlers"
 "The Cinema Show"
 "Robbery, Assault and Battery" (omitted on 25 June 1976)
 "White Mountain" 
 "Firth of Fifth"
 "Entangled" (omitted on 15 April 1976)
 "Squonk" (omitted on 15 April 1976)
 "Supper's Ready" 
 "I Know What I Like (In Your Wardrobe)"
 "Los Endos"
 "it." (omitted on 16 June 1976)
 "Watcher of the Skies" (omitted on 16 June 1976)

Members 
 Phil Collins – vocals, percussion, drums
 Tony Banks – Hammond T-102 organ, Mellotron M-400, RMI 368x Electra Piano and Harpsichord; ARP Pro Soloist and ARP 2600 synthesizers, 12-string guitar, backing vocals
 Steve Hackett – electric and 12-string guitars
 Mike Rutherford – bass, Moog Taurus bass pedals, 12-string & electric guitars,  backing vocals
 Bill Bruford – drums, percussion

Tour dates

Box office score data

References 

Genesis (band) concert tours
1976 concert tours